Stylista was an American fashion-themed reality-television competition series that premiered on the CW network in the United States, and Citytv in Canada on October 22, 2008 and ran for one season. The series was produced by Warner Horizon Television and Tyra Banks through her Bankable Productions. On January 30, 2008, The CW approved the series for production.

Johanna Cox was named the winner on December 17, 2008 at the 9th episode conclusion. She won a paid editorial position at Elle magazine, a paid lease on an apartment in Manhattan, and a clothing allowance at H&M, all for one year, valued at $100,000.

Contestants

Elimination chart

 This contestant won Stylista
 This contestant won the Editorial challenge
 This contestant was on the losing team but not eliminated
 This contestant was in the bottom 2 or 3
 This contestant was eliminated

Episode 6 was the recap episode

Episodes

References

External links
 

2000s American reality television series
2008 American television series debuts
2008 American television series endings
Fashion-themed reality television series
The CW original programming
Television series by Warner Horizon Television
Reality competition television series